Kadamba Kanana Swami (1953–2023) was a senior member and initiating guru of the International Society for Krishna Consciousness (ISKCON).

Born on April 12, 1953 in the town of Heemstede, near Amsterdam, Kadamba Kanana Swami ventured to India on a quest to seek out a greater meaning to life. He joined ISKCON's Vrindavan temple, Krishna Balaram Mandir, in 1978, serving in various managerial roles, and went on to become temple president from 1990 to 1995.

In the 1980s, Kadamba Kanana Swami began visiting Australia and Belgium, developing a long-standing relationship with the local communities. He oversaw the construction of ISKCON founder-acharya A. C. Bhaktivedanta Swami Prabhupada's pushpa samadhi mandir (memorial shrine) in Mayapur, India, and was a member of the Mayapur Administrative Council, the committee that oversees the daily management of the project from 1985 to 1990. Later, he continued with more service in Mayapur from 2012 to 2016 by being part of the Executive Committee coordinating the development of the master plan.

Kadamba Kanana Swami took sannyasa initiation from his guru, Jayadvaita Swami, in 1997 and now travels extensively around the world spreading the message of Lord Caitanya’s movement.  As a sannyasi, he had been active in a great variety of projects. He became deeply involved in South Africa and spent substantial time there from 1995 to 2023. In a country with a long history of apartheid, he built bridges between communities and in reaching out to- and in offering support the local African community in Krsna consciousness. He brought the Festival of Chariots to Soweto, where he observed local African people dancing in ecstasy in front of a tv which was playing Ratha Yatra kirtans from the Durban festival. This experience touched his heart and since then he wanted Soweto to have their own Ratha Yatra festival. The first place he was invited to after taking sannyasa was the Czech Republic, where he spent substantial time, and has quite a number of followers there. Radhadesh, in Belgium was started mostly by devotees from the Netherlands, so he had a natural connection there, he has been lecturing at the Bhaktivedanta College and leads the annual King's Day festival harinam, where hundreds of devotees take to the bustling streets of Amsterdam for a day of singing and dancing. From 2000 to 2008 he has been leading the New Vrajamandala Farm, to save the farm from being sold. In recent years from 2017 to 2022 he has been involved in NYC the city from where Srila Prabhupada began a Worldwide mission to help the revival of the local temple. In 2001, Kadamba Kanana Swami began his service as an initiating spiritual master and has since then initiated about a thousand disciple across the globe.

Kadamba Kanana Swami is the author of several books, such as Nothing but the Holy Name and Words of a Public Hermit, “ Devotional Service”, “ Wonderful Krishna”, “ Kirtaniya Sada Harih”, “Golokera Prema Dhana”, and “Under the Desire Trees”, available from kksblog. Being widely recognized for his melodic voice and up tempo rhythm, Kadamba Kanana Swami is frequently invited to perform at various singing festivals (kirtan melas) around the world. He has also recorded over ten albums to fund the various projects that he supports.

Samadhi (Death) 
HH Kadamba Kanana Swami took Samadhi at 12:06 pm on 9th of March 2023 on the day of Tukaram
Beej, two days after Gaura Purnima.

See also
 List of International Society for Krishna Consciousness sannyasis
 ISKCON guru system

References

External links
 
Biography of H.H. Kadamba Kanana Swami
Kadamba Kanana Swami on the Official Site of ISKCON Germany and Austria
Accept what we are!' - interview with Kadamba Kanana Swami
Bhaktivedanta College Starts Sixth Academic Year
Writings by Kadamba Kanana Swami

Bhaktivedanta College
International Society for Krishna Consciousness religious figures
Living people
1953 births
Dutch Hindus
Converts to Hinduism
Hindu monks